Slab Creek Dam is a dam in the American River watershed of the central Sierra Nevada, within El Dorado County, California.  

The dam and reservoir impound the upper South Fork American River for hydroelectric power, and are named for Slab Creek, a nearby tributary.

Dam
The concrete arch dam was constructed in 1967 as part of the Upper American River Project by the Sacramento Municipal Utility District (SMUD).

Slab Creek Dam is one of several dams and reservoirs owned by SMUD. Others include the 1959 Ice House Dam, the 1963 Loon Lake Dam, and the 1963 Union Valley  Dam.

Slab Creek Reservoir
Recreation on and around the reservoir includes fishing, camping, and rafting.

Iowa Hill Pumped-Storage Project
An additional project called the Iowa Hill Pumped-Storage Project was planned in 2001, which would have taken water from the Slab Creek reservoir during off-peak times, to be released for electricity generation at times of high demand. In February 2016 the project was cancelled, on the grounds that by the time it was completed, that type of storage would not be needed.

See also 

 
 
 List of dams and reservoirs in California

References 

Dams on the American River
Arch dams
Hydroelectric power plants in California
Sacramento Municipal Utility District dams
Dams completed in 1967
Energy infrastructure completed in 1967
1967 establishments in California